Nathan F. Ford (born May 23, 1927), was an American politician in the state of Tennessee. Ford served in the Tennessee House of Representatives as a Republican from the 11th District from 1983 to 1984. A native of Del Rio, Tennessee, he was an optometrist and alumnus of the Southern College of Optometry.

References

1927 births
Living people
Republican Party members of the Tennessee House of Representatives
People from Cocke County, Tennessee